Tang In Chim (born 28 February 2003) is a Hong Kong professional footballer who currently plays as a midfielder for Hong Kong Premier League club HK U23.

Career statistics

Club

Notes

References

Living people
2003 births
Hong Kong footballers
Hong Kong youth international footballers
Association football midfielders
Hong Kong Premier League players
HK U23 Football Team players